Kuntilanak is a 2018 Indonesian horror film directed by Rizal Mantovani and written by Alim Sudio.

The plot revolves around five children who find a mirror in their orphanage. The mirror contains a ghost that kidnaps children and imprisons them inside it.

Cast 
 Sandrinna M. Skornicki as Dinda
 Aurélie Moeremans as Lydia
 Fero Walandouw as Glenn
 Nena Rosier as Tante Donna
 Andryan Bima as Kresna
 Ciara Nadine Brosnan as Ambar
 Adlu Fahrezi as Panji
 Ali Fikry as Miko
 Naufal Ho as Anjas
 Wina Marrino as Miranda
 Aditya Rino as Cameraman
 Aqi Singgih as Lukman
 Ady Sky as Creative

Production 
This film is a remake of the 2006 film with the same name. "Is there any relation with the previous story? Basically there is an element that is a 'connector', that is a mirror. And that is the important meaning of Kuntilanak then and now," said the executive producer, Amrit Punjabi.

Sequel 
A sequel, Kuntilanak 2, was released on June 4, 2019 and 3 years later Kuntilanak 3 was released on 30 April 2022.

References

External links 
 

2018 films
2018 horror films
Indonesian children's films
Indonesian comedy horror films
2010s Indonesian-language films
Remakes of Indonesian films
Films about children
Children's horror films
2018 comedy horror films